The National Basketball League (China) Scoring Leader are the season by season individual scoring leaders of the National Basketball League (China) (NBL-China). It is an award for players that inaugurated during the 2009-10 season. The present holder of the award is Russ Smith. The main criteria for the award is that the player must attain the highest points per game average for the entire season.

List of Scoring Champions

Multiple time winners

References

External links
  

2